The men's super heavyweight (+91 kg/200.2 lb) Low-Kick division at the W.A.K.O. European Championships 2006 in Skopje was the heaviest of the male Low-Kick tournaments and involved seven fighters.  Each of the matches was three rounds of two minutes each and were fought under Low-Kick kickboxing rules.

As there were not enough participants for a tournament designed for eight, one of the men had a bye through to the semi finals. The tournament champion was Dragan Jovanović from Serbia, who won gold by defeating Azerbaijani Hafiz Bakhshaliyev in the final by unanimous decision. Defeated semi finalists Goran Radonic from Montenegro and Jan Antoska from Slovakia won bronze.

Results

Key

See also
List of WAKO Amateur European Championships
List of WAKO Amateur World Championships
List of male kickboxers

References

External links
 WAKO World Association of Kickboxing Organizations Official Site

W.A.K.O. European Championships 2006 (Skopje)